"As Long as I Can Dream" is a song by the American girl group Exposé. It was co-written by Roy Orbison and Diane Warren and appears on the group's self-titled third album. Lead vocals on the song were sung by Ann Curless. The song features guitarist Al Pitrelli of Megadeth, Alice Cooper, Trans-Siberian Orchestra, one of two tracks he played.

In 1999, singer Debelah Morgan recorded a cover version of the song that was included on the soundtrack to the film Stuart Little.

Reception
Released as the third single from the album Exposé, "As Long as I Can Dream" peaked at #55 on the Billboard Hot 100 chart and at #21 on the Billboard adult contemporary chart in 1993.

Track listing

Exposé U.S. CD Maxi-single
 "As Long as I Can Dream" (4:49)
 "Point of No Return" (3:28)
 "Come Go with Me" (4:17)
 "What You Don't Know" (4:20)
 "Face to Face" (4:22)

Charts

References

External links
Exposé CD Maxi-single release info from discogs.com

1993 singles
Exposé (group) songs
Debelah Morgan songs
Roy Orbison songs
Songs written by Diane Warren
Pop ballads
Songs written by Roy Orbison
1992 songs
Arista Records singles
1990s ballads